Alafosfalin, also known as alaphosphin, is an phosphonodipeptide with antibacterial and antifungal properties.

References

Dipeptides
Phosphonic acids